Renmin Daxue (Renmin Univ.) Station is a station on Line 4 of the Beijing Subway. It is located near the east gate of Renmin University.

Station Layout 
The station has an underground island platform.

Exits 
There are 5 exits, lettered A1, A2, B, C, and D. Exit B is accessible.

References

External links
 

Beijing Subway stations in Haidian District
Railway stations in China opened in 2009
Railway stations in China at university and college campuses
Renmin University of China